George V. Eleftheriades is a researcher in the field of metamaterials. He has been endowed with a Canada Research Chair at the University of Toronto and is a professor in the Department of Computer and Electrical Engineering there. He has received notable awards for his achievements, is a fellow of the  IEEE and the Royal Society of Canada.

Also, at the University of Toronto, he heads a group for research in novel electromagnetic materials. He has also contributed chapters to several books on antennas and transmission line theory that utilize metamaterials, along with other novel concepts, and is co-editor of one book in the same field. Eleftheriades is also the author and co-author of a significant volume of published research in peer reviewed journals.
Mr. Eleftheriades earned his Ph.D. and M.S.E.E. degrees in Electrical Engineering from the University of Michigan, Ann Arbor, in 1993 and 1989 respectively. He received a diploma (with distinction) in Electrical Engineering from the National Technical University of Athens, Greece in 1988.

Awards and recognitions 
Eleftheriades was elected IEEE fellow "for contributions to conception, analysis and fabrication of electromagnetic materials and their applications."

He received the 2008 IEEE Kiyo Tomiyasu Award, a Technical Field Award conferred by the IEEE Board of Directors.
In 2004, he was awarded the E.W.R. Steacie Memorial Fellowship by the Natural Sciences and Engineering Research Council of Canada.

Published works

Books

References

External links
George V. Eleftheriades
Negative-Refractive-Index Transmission-Line Metamaterials and Enabling Microwave Devices
Projects

Living people
Metamaterials scientists
Academic staff of the University of Toronto
Fellow Members of the IEEE
American scientists
Year of birth missing (living people)
Microwave engineers
University of Michigan College of Engineering alumni